Dallal Merwa Achour (born November 3, 1994 in Blida, Algeria) is an Algerian volleyball player.  Achour has been selected to play for the Algeria women's national volleyball team at the 2012 Summer Olympics.

Clubs
  Debut and current club :  ESF Mouzaïa

References

1994 births
Living people
Algerian women's volleyball players
People from Blida
Olympic volleyball players of Algeria
Volleyball players at the 2012 Summer Olympics
Middle blockers
21st-century Algerian people